Lecarrow is a village in County Roscommon, Ireland. Situated 17 kilometres north-west of the town of Athlone on the N61 route between Athlone and Roscommon town. A navigable canal, the Lecarrow Canal, connects it to Lough Ree, the second-largest lake on the River Shannon. Many of its residents commute to Athlone and Roscommon. It is the closest population centre to the Geographical centre of Ireland.

See also
 List of towns and villages in Ireland

References

Towns and villages in County Roscommon